This is a list of commercial banks in South Sudan.
 African National Bank
 Afriland First Bank South Sudan
 Agricultural Bank	of South Sudan
 Buffalo Commercial Bank
 Charter One Bank South Sudan
 Commercial Bank of Ethiopia (South Sudan)
 Cooperative Bank of South Sudan
 Ecobank South Sudan
 Eden Commercial Bank
 Equity Bank South Sudan Limited
 International Commercial Bank
 Ivory Bank
 KCB Bank South Sudan Limited
 Kush Bank Plc
 Liberty Commercial Bank
 National Bank of Egypt Juba 
 Mountain Trade and Development Bank
 National Credit Bank
 Nile Commercial Bank
 Opportunity Bank South Sudan
 Southern Rock Bank
 People's Bank Plc
 Phoenix Commercial Bank
 Qatar National Bank
 Regent African Bank
 Royal Express Bank
 South Sudan Commercial Bank
 Stanbic Bank South Sudan Limited	
 Alpha Commercial Bank
 Ebony National Bank
 St. Theresa Rural Development Bank

See also

References

External links
 Website of Buffalo Commercial Bank
 President Kiir Inaugurates CFC Stanbic Bank Branch In Juba

 
South Sudan
Banks
South Sudan